The 1910 European Rowing Championships were rowing championships held in the Belgian city of Ostend. The competition, held on 15 August, was for men only and they competed in five boat classes (M1x, M2x, M2+, M4+, M8+).

Medal summary
There is uncertainty about the results shown in the table below. The Italian rowing historian Maurizio Ustolin writes that Venetian rowers from Querini Venezia and Bucintoro Venezia were medallists in all five boat classes. According to Ustolin, Querini won gold in the coxed four (as shown below) and silver in the coxed pair (missing from the table below), with Bucintoro winning silver in the three remaining boat classes (the results show a bronze medal for the Italian single sculler instead). Rowing scholar Peter Mallory then repeated Ustolin's claims in a book chapter on early Italian rowing.

Footnotes

References

European Rowing Championships
European Rowing Championships
Rowing
Rowing
European Rowing Championships
Sport in Ostend